Khyriv  is a town in Sambir Raion, Lviv Oblast (region) of Ukraine with a population of around  It hosts the administration of Khyriv urban hromada, one of the hromadas of Ukraine. 

It became known principally for the celebrated eponymous Jesuit secondary boys school founded there in 1886. The institution, which produced 6,000 alumni during its existence, ceased all activity when the then Polish town fell to Soviet forces in 1939.
 
Khyriv was first mentioned in documents from 1374. At that time it was the private property of the noble Polish family of Herburt and was part of Poland's Ruthenian Voivodeship. In 1528 Chyrów, as it is called in Polish, received Magdeburg rights, and three years later, the first Roman Catholic church was founded there by Andrzej Tarło. The wooden church probably burned down during the Great Northern War, and in 1710, it was replaced by a brick structure. In 1740, a synagogue opened in the town. 

For over 400 years Chyrów belonged to Przemyśl Land, in the Ruthenian Voivodeship, of the Kingdom of Poland. It was the property of the powerful landowning Ossolinski and Mniszech families. In 1772, following the Partitions of Poland, Chyrów was annexed by the Habsburg Empire and remained in Austrian Galicia until late 1918. In 1872 a rail connection was established there with a station. In the 1880s, a state of the art vast purpose-built complex was erected there for a College on the outskirts of the town by the Polish province of the Society of Jesus. By 1913 the population of Chyrów was 3,400. 

During the Polish–Ukrainian War it was the site of heavy Polish – Ukrainian fighting from late 1918 into early 1919. The war was won by Poland, and until the 1939 Invasion of Poland, Chyrów remained within the territory of the Second Polish Republic. According to the 1921 census, the population of Chyrów was 2,654. In the interbellum period, Chyrów formed part of Sambór County, in the Lwow Voivodeship. With the outbreak of the Second World War, caused by the invasion of Poland, the Red Army occupied the entire region in September 1939 until 1941, when it was seized by the German Wehrmacht until 1943, before being re-taken by forces of the Soviet Union. From 1944 the town and its surroundings was annexed by the USSR. With the collapse of the Soviet empire in 1991, the town came under the jurisdiction of present-day Ukraine.

Until 18 July 2020, Khyriv belonged to Staryi Sambir Raion. The raion was abolished in July 2020 as part of the administrative reform of Ukraine, which reduced the number of raions of Lviv Oblast to seven. The area of Staryi Sambir Raion was merged into Sambir Raion.

Gallery

References

Cities in Lviv Oblast
Cities of district significance in Ukraine